Life Insurance is the debut album by rapper, Mr. Serv-On. It was released on August 5, 1997 through No Limit Records and was mostly produced by the labels in-house production team, Beats By the Pound, with one track produced by Brotha Lynch Hung. The album was both a commercial and critical success selling 98,000 units in one week, peaking at #20 on the Billboard 200 and #12 on the Top R&B/Hip-Hop Albums,.

Track listing
"Let's Get It Started"- 4:18 (featuring Master P, Mia X and Silkk the Shocker)
"My Best Friend"- 5:03 (featuring Master P)
"Head & Shoulders"- 4:44 (featuring Mia X and Silkk the Shocker)
"Heaven Is So Close"- 5:35 (featuring Master P, Silkk the Shocker, Kenya Miller and Mo B. Dick)
"It's Real"- 4:25 (featuring Brotha Lynch Hung and Master P)
"Pussy Dreams"- 4:04  (featuring Odell)
"Die Rich"- 4:50 (featuring Mac, Prime Suspects and Lil Gotti of Gambino Family)
"Who Raised Me"- 4:47 (featuring Fiend)
"You Know I Would"- 3:29 (featuring Mia X)
"Hustlin"- 3:45 (featuring Master P and Mystikal)
"Cemetery Made"- 3:51 (featuring C-Murder)
"5 Hollow Points"- 4:17 (featuring Mia X, Big Ed the Assassin, Fiend and Kane & Abel)
"Tryin' to Make It Out da Ghetto"- 3:04 (featuring Master P and Mac)
"Time to Check My Fetty"- 3:25 (featuring Master P)
"Affiliated"- 4:09
"We Ain't the Same"- 4:34 (featuring Big Ed the Assassin and Mo B. Dick)
"Throw Ya City Up"- 3:59
"Last Wordz"- 4:11 (featuring Mia X)

Charts

Weekly charts

Year-end charts

References

1997 debut albums
Mr. Serv-On albums
No Limit Records albums
Priority Records albums
Gangsta rap albums by American artists